The Mount Thielsen Wilderness is a wilderness area located on and around Mount Thielsen in the southern Cascade Range of Oregon in the United States.  It is located within the Deschutes, Umpqua, and Fremont–Winema national forests.  It was established by the United States Congress in 1984 and comprises .

Topography
The mountain was carved by glacial activity and is sometimes referred to as the "Lightning Rod of the Cascades." To the south of the wilderness is Crater Lake National Park. The rest of the wilderness consists of flat and moderately rolling hills, which change to very steep and sharply dissected ridges toward the crest of the Cascade Mountains.

Popular lakes in the wilderness include Lake Lucille and Maidu Lake.  The headwaters of the Wild and Scenic North Umpqua River are at Maidu.

Vegetation

Lodgepole pine dominate the lower portion of the Mount Thielsen Wilderness.

Recreation
Primary recreational activities in the Mount Thielsen Wilderness include camping, hiking, wildlife watching, and rock climbing.

See also
 List of Oregon Wildernesses
 List of U.S. Wilderness Areas
 List of old growth forests
 Wilderness Act

References

External links

Mt. Thielsen Wilderness - Deschutes National Forest
Mt. Theilsen Wilderness - Umpqua National Forest
Mt. Thielsen Wilderness - Fremont–Winema National Forest

Cascade Range
Protected areas of Douglas County, Oregon
Protected areas of Klamath County, Oregon
Wilderness areas of Oregon
Umpqua National Forest
Fremont–Winema National Forest
Deschutes National Forest
1984 establishments in Oregon
Protected areas established in 1984